The Novartis-Drew Award for Biomedical Research is an award jointly presented by Novartis and Drew University. It comprises a cash award (originally $2000) and a plaque. The award was initially created as the Ciba-Drew Award for Biomedical Research and renamed following the change of company name from Ciba-Geigy to Novartis in 1996.

Incomplete list of winners
Novartis-Drew Award
2003: Elaine Fuchs; Philip A. Sharp; David Botstein
2002: Frank McCormick ; Brian J. Druker ; Harold Varmus
2001: Sidney Brenner ; Eric Lander ; Craig Venter
2000: Susan L. Lindquist
1999: Elizabeth Helen Blackburn; Joan Steitz
1998: Tom Maniatis; Alexander Varshavsky
1997: Edward Alan Berger

Ciba-Drew Award
1996: H. Robert Horvitz; Stanley J. Korsmeyer
1995: Joseph Schlessinger; Günter Blobel ; Arnold J. Levine
1994: Thomas R. Cech; Albert Eschenmoser; Manfred Eigen
1993: Leroy Hood; Francis S. Collins
1992: Stuart L. Schreiber ; Peter G. Schultz ; Richard Lerner
1991: Sir Michael Berridge
1990: Roger David Kornberg; Nicholas R. Cozzarelli
1989: Robert William Mahley
1988: Samuel Broder; Robert C. Gallo ; Luc Montagnier
1987: Thomas A. Waldmann
1986: Michael H. Wigler
1985: Jean-Pierre Changeux ; Solomon Halbert Snyder
1984: Albrecht Fleckenstein ; Harald Reuter
1983: Ronald Levy; 
1982:
1981: C. Ronald Kahn; Donald F. Steiner ; Sydney Brenner 
1980: Bengt I. Samuelsson; John Robert Vane
1979: Paul Greengard
1978:
1977: Robert C. Gallo; Fred Rapp

See also

 List of biochemistry awards

References

Science and technology awards
Biomedicine
Biochemistry awards
American awards